John Warnock Hinckley Jr. (born May 29, 1955) is an American man  who attempted to assassinate U.S. President Ronald Reagan in Washington, D.C. on March 30, 1981, two months after Reagan's first inauguration. Using a .22 caliber revolver, Hinckley wounded Reagan, police officer Thomas Delahanty, and Secret Service agent Tim McCarthy. He critically wounded White House Press Secretary James Brady, who was left permanently disabled.

Hinckley was reportedly seeking fame to impress actress Jodie Foster, with whom he had an obsessive fixation. He was found not guilty by reason of insanity and remained under institutional psychiatric care for over three decades. Public outcry over the verdict led to the Insanity Defense Reform Act of 1984, which altered the rules for consideration of mental illness of defendants in Federal Criminal Court proceedings in the U.S.

In 2016, a federal judge ruled that Hinckley could be released from psychiatric care as he was no longer considered a threat to himself or others, albeit with many conditions. After 2020, a ruling was issued that Hinckley may showcase his artwork, writings, and music publicly under his own name, rather than anonymously as he had in the past. Since then, he has maintained a YouTube channel for his music. His restrictions were unconditionally lifted in June 2022.

Early life 
John Warnock Hinckley Jr. was born in Ardmore, Oklahoma, and moved with his wealthy family to Dallas, Texas at the age of four. His father was John Warnock Hinckley (June 6, 1925 – January 29, 2008), founder, chairman, chief executive and president of the Vanderbilt Energy Corporation. His mother was Jo Ann Hinckley (née Moore; December 7, 1925 – July 30, 2021).

Hinckley grew up in University Park, Texas, and attended Highland Park High School in Dallas County. After Hinckley graduated from high school in 1974, his family, owners of the Hinckley oil company, moved to Evergreen, Colorado, where the new company headquarters was located. He was an off-and-on student at Texas Tech University from 1974 to 1980 but eventually dropped out. In 1975, he went to Los Angeles in the hope of becoming a songwriter. His efforts were unsuccessful, and he wrote to his parents with tales of misfortune and pleas for money. He also spoke of a girlfriend, Lynn Collins, who turned out to be a fabrication. In September 1976, he returned to his parents' home in Evergreen. In the late 1970s and early 1980s, Hinckley began purchasing weapons and practicing with them. He was prescribed antidepressants and tranquilizers to deal with his emotional problems.

Obsession with Jodie Foster 

Hinckley became obsessed with the 1976 film Taxi Driver, in which disturbed protagonist Travis Bickle (Robert De Niro) plots to assassinate a presidential candidate. Bickle was partly based on the diaries of Arthur Bremer, who attempted to assassinate George Wallace. Hinckley developed an infatuation with Jodie Foster, who played Iris Steensma, a sexually trafficked 12-year-old child, in the film. When Foster entered Yale University, Hinckley moved to New Haven, Connecticut, for a short time to stalk her. He sent Foster love letters and romantic poems, and repeatedly called and left her messages.

Failing to develop any meaningful contact with Foster, Hinckley fantasized about conducting an aircraft hijacking or killing himself in front of her to get her attention. Eventually, he settled on a scheme to impress her by assassinating the president, thinking that by achieving a place in history, he would appeal to her as an equal. Hinckley trailed President Jimmy Carter from state to state, and was arrested in Nashville, Tennessee, on a firearms charge. Penniless, he returned home. Despite psychiatric treatment for depression, his mental health did not improve. He began to target the newly elected president Ronald Reagan in 1981. For this purpose, he collected material on the assassination of John F. Kennedy.

Hinckley wrote to Foster just before his attempt on Reagan's life:

Ronald Reagan assassination attempt 

On March 30, 1981, at 2:27 p.m. EST, Hinckley shot a .22 caliber Röhm RG-14 revolver six times at Reagan as he left the Hilton Hotel in Washington, D.C., after the president addressed an AFL–CIO conference.

Hinckley wounded police officer Thomas Delahanty and Secret Service agent Timothy McCarthy, and critically wounded press secretary James Brady. Though Hinckley did not hit Reagan directly, the president was seriously wounded when a bullet ricocheted off the side of the presidential limousine and hit him in the chest. Alfred Antenucci, a Cleveland, Ohio labor official who stood near Hinckley and saw him firing, hit Hinckley in the head and pulled him to the ground. Within two seconds agent Dennis McCarthy (no relation to agent Timothy McCarthy) dove onto Hinckley, intent on protecting Hinckley and to avoid what happened to Lee Harvey Oswald, who was killed before he could be tried for the assassination of President Kennedy. Another Cleveland-area labor official, Frank J. McNamara, joined Antenucci and started punching Hinckley in the head, striking him so hard he drew blood. Brady had been shot by Hinckley in the right side of the head, and endured a long recuperation period, remaining paralyzed on the left side of his body until his death on August 4, 2014. Brady's death was ruled a homicide 33 years after the shooting.

At his 1982 trial in Washington, D.C., having been charged with 13 offenses, Hinckley was found not guilty by reason of insanity on June 21. The defense psychiatric reports portrayed Hinckley as insane while the prosecution reports characterized him as legally sane. Hinckley was transferred into psychiatric care from Bureau of Prisons custody on August 18, 1981. Soon after his trial, Hinckley wrote that the shooting was "the greatest love offering in the history of the world" and was disappointed that Foster did not reciprocate his love.

The verdict resulted in widespread dismay. As a consequence, the United States Congress and a number of states revised laws governing when a defendant may use the insanity defense in a criminal prosecution. Idaho, Montana, and Utah abolished the defense altogether. In the United States, before the Hinckley case, the insanity defense had been used in less than 2% of all felony cases and was unsuccessful in almost 75% of those trials. Public outcry over the verdict led to the Insanity Defense Reform Act of 1984, which altered the rules for consideration of mental illness of defendants in federal criminal court proceedings. In 1985, Hinckley's parents wrote Breaking Points, a book detailing their son's mental condition.

Changes in federal and some state rules of evidence laws have since excluded or restricted the use of testimony of an expert witness, such as a psychologist or psychiatrist, regarding conclusions on "ultimate" issues in insanity defense cases, including whether a criminal defendant is legally "insane", but this is not the rule in most states.

Vincent J. Fuller, an attorney who represented Hinckley during his trial and for several years afterward, said Hinckley has schizophrenia. Park Dietz, a forensic psychiatrist who testified for the prosecution, diagnosed Hinckley with narcissistic and schizoid personality disorders and dysthymia, as well as borderline and passive-aggressive features. At the hospital, Hinckley was treated for narcissistic and schizotypal personality disorder and major depressive disorder.

Treatment 

Hinckley was confined at St. Elizabeths Hospital in Washington, D.C. After Hinckley was admitted, tests found that he was an "unpredictably dangerous" man who might harm himself or any third party. In 1983, he told Penthouse that on a normal day he would "see a therapist, answer mail, play guitar, listen to music, play pool, watch television, eat lousy food and take delicious medication". Around 1987, Hinckley applied for a court order allowing him periodic home visits. As part of the consideration of the request, the judge ordered Hinckley's hospital room searched. Hospital officials found photographs and letters in Hinckley's room that showed a continued obsession with Foster, as well as evidence that Hinckley had exchanged letters with serial killer Ted Bundy, and sought the address of the incarcerated Charles Manson, who had inspired Lynette Fromme to try to kill United States President Gerald Ford. The court denied Hinckley's request for additional privileges.

In 1999, Hinckley was permitted to leave the hospital for supervised visits with his parents. In April 2000, the hospital recommended allowing unsupervised releases, but rescinded the recommendation a month later. Hinckley was allowed supervised visits with his parents again during 2004 and 2005. Court hearings were held in September 2005 on whether he could have expanded privileges to leave the hospital.

On December 30, 2005, a federal judge ruled that Hinckley would be allowed visits, supervised by his parents, to their home in Williamsburg, Virginia. The judge ruled that Hinckley could have up to three visits of three nights and then four visits of four nights, each depending on the successful completion of the last. All of the experts who testified at Hinckley's 2005 conditional release hearing, including the government experts, agreed that his depression and psychotic disorder were in full remission and that he should have some expanded conditions of release.

In 2007, Hinckley requested further freedoms, including two one-week visits with his parents, and a month-long visit. U.S. District Judge Paul L. Friedman denied that request on June 6, 2007.

On June 17, 2009, Judge Friedman ruled that Hinckley would be permitted to visit his mother for a dozen visits of 10 days at a time, rather than six, to spend more time outside of the hospital, and to have a driver's license. The court also ordered that Hinckley be required to carry a GPS-enabled cell phone to track him whenever he was outside of his parents' home. He was prohibited from speaking with the news media. The prosecutors objected to this ruling, saying that Hinckley was still a danger to others and had unhealthy and inappropriate thoughts about women. Hinckley recorded a song, "Ballad of an Outlaw", which the prosecutors claim is "reflecting suicide and lawlessness".

In March 2011, it was reported that a forensic psychologist at the hospital testified that "Hinckley has recovered to the point that he poses no imminent risk of danger to himself or others". On March 29, 2011, the day before the 30th anniversary of the assassination attempt, Hinckley's attorney filed a court petition requesting more freedom for his client, including additional unsupervised visits to the Virginia home of Hinckley's mother, Joanne. On November 30, 2011, a hearing in Washington was held to consider whether he could live full-time outside the hospital. The Justice Department opposed this, stating that Hinckley still poses a danger to the public. Justice Department counsel argued that Hinckley had been known to deceive his doctors in the past.

By December 2013, the court ordered that visits be extended to his mother, who lives near Williamsburg. Hinckley was permitted up to eight 17-day visits, with evaluation after the completion of each one.

On August 4, 2014, James Brady died. As Hinckley had critically wounded Brady in 1981, the death was ruled a homicide. Hinckley did not face charges as a result of Brady's death because he had been found not guilty of the original crime by reason of insanity. In addition, since Brady's death occurred more than 33 years after the shooting, prosecution of Hinckley was barred under the year and a day law in effect in the District of Columbia at the time of the shooting.

Release 
On July 27, 2016, a federal judge ruled that Hinckley could be released from St. Elizabeths on August 5, as he was no longer considered a threat to himself or others.

Hinckley was released from institutional psychiatric care on September 10, 2016, with many conditions. He was required to live full-time at his mother's home in Williamsburg, Virginia. In addition, the following prohibitions and requirements were imposed on him.

Prohibitions
 drinking alcohol
 possessing any firearms, ammunition, other weapons, or memorabilia of Jodie Foster, e.g., photos, or magazine articles
 contacting Reagan's family, Brady's family, Jodie Foster, Foster's family, or Foster's agent
 from watching or listening to violent movies, television, or compact discs
 from accessing printed or online pornography
 online access to violent movies, television, music, novels or magazines
 speaking to the press
 visiting present or past homes of the current or past president or certain past or present government officials
 visiting graves of past presidents or certain past government officials
 driving from his mother's home more than  unattended or  when attended
 erasing his computer's Web browser history

Required
 to work at least 3 days per week
 to leave immediately if he finds himself approaching prohibited places
 to record his browser history

Although the court ordered a risk assessment to be completed within 18 months of his release, it had not been done .

On November 16, 2018, Judge Friedman ruled Hinckley could move out of his mother's house in Virginia and live on his own upon location approval from his doctors. On September 10, 2019, Hinckley's attorney stated that he had planned to ask for full, unconditional release from the court orders that determined how he could live by the end of that year.

On September 27, 2021, a federal judge approved Hinckley for unconditional release beginning June 2022.

On June 15, 2022, Hinckley was fully released from court restrictions.

Depiction in media 
Phoenix, Arizona hardcore punk band Jodie Foster's Army (JFA) formed in 1981 and their name was a reference to the assassination attempt. Their eponymous song referred to Hinckley.  Ohio new wave band Devo recorded a song "I Desire" for their fifth studio album, Oh, No! It's Devo (1982), which brought the band controversy because the lyrics were taken directly from a poem written by Hinckley. Hinckley has claimed that he has not received royalties for the use of his poem by them. In 1984 Lansing, Michigan hardcore band the Crucifucks recorded "Hinkley Had a Vision"  which expressed a desire to kill the president.  Another new wave band, Wall of Voodoo, released a song about Hinckley and his life titled "Far Side of Crazy" (1985), with the name also being a quotation from his poetry. Singer-songwriter Carmaig de Forest devoted a verse of his song "Hey Judas" to Hinckley, blaming him for Reagan's increased popularity following the assassination attempt.

Hinckley is featured as a character of the Stephen Sondheim and John Weidman musical Assassins (1990), in which he and Lynette Fromme sing "Unworthy Of Your Love", a duet about their respective obsessions with Foster and Charles Manson. Hinckley's life leading up to the assassination attempt is fictionalized in the 2015 novel Calf by Andrea Kleine. The novel also includes a fictionalization of Hinckley's former girlfriend, Leslie deVeau, whom he met at St. Elizabeths Hospital.

Hinckley is portrayed by Steven Flynn in the American television film, Without Warning: The James Brady Story (1991). Hinckley appears as a character in the television film The Day Reagan Was Shot (2001), portrayed by Christian Lloyd. He was portrayed by Kevin Woodhouse in the television film The Reagans (2003). Hinckley is portrayed by Kyle S. More in the movie Killing Reagan, released in 2016. In the TV series  Timeless (2018), he is portrayed by Erik Stocklin.

Sketch comedy show The Whitest Kids U' Know made a skit that fictionalized the attempted assassination while also satirizing the presidency of Ronald Reagan

Transgressive punk rock singer GG Allin was arrested by the US Secret Service in Illinois in September 1989 after he corresponded with Hinckley and they discovered he had an outstanding arrest warrant for assault in Michigan.

Songwriting and performance 
As a young adult, Hinckley made unsuccessful efforts to become a songwriter; years later he posted music online anonymously but received little interest. In October 2020, a federal court ruled that Hinckley may showcase and market his artwork, writings, and music publicly under his own name, but his treatment team could rescind the display privilege. Hinckley created a YouTube channel where, since December 2020, he has posted videos of himself performing original songs with a guitar and covers of songs such as "Blowin' in the Wind" by Bob Dylan and the Elvis Presley song "Can't Help Falling in Love". His subscribers totaled over 30,900 by November 2022.

On June 6, 2021, Hinckley stated in a YouTube video that he was working on an album and looking for a record label to release it. Hinckley later announced in December 2021 that the album would be released in early 2022 on Emporia Records, a label he founded to "[release] the music of others, music that needs to be heard."

On October 7, 2021, Hinckley self-published his first single called "We Have Got That Chemistry" onto streaming platforms.

On November 10, 2021, Hinckley self-published another single called "You Let Whiskey Do Your Talking" onto multiple streaming platforms. Hinckley has also continued to release other original songs on his YouTube channel.

In January 2022, Hinckley announced that he was looking for members for his own band.

On June 15, 2022, it was announced that what would have been Hinckley's first live performance in front of a physically present audience at a Brooklyn, New York venue had been canceled over security concerns for "vulnerable communities" after it had received threats. Three other planned concerts that summer, in Chicago; Hamden, Connecticut; and Williamsburg, Virginia were also cancelled because of threats to the venues. Asbestos Records announced that they planned to release some of Hinckley's songs on vinyl in the fall of 2022. As of 2023, the album remains unreleased.

See also 

 United States federal laws governing defendants with mental diseases or defects
 Samuel Byck (attempted Nixon 1974)
 Lynette Fromme (attempted Ford 1975)
 Sara Jane Moore (attempted Ford 1975)
 Vladimir Arutyunian (attempted G. W. Bush 2005)

References

Further reading 
 Clarke, James W. (2006). Defining Danger: American Assassins and the New Domestic Terrorists.
 Clarke, James W. (1990). On Being Mad or Merely Angry: John W. Hinckley Jr. and Other Dangerous People. Princeton University Press.
 Hinckley, John W. (September 20, 1982).  "The Insanity Defense and Me". Newsweek.

External links 

 
 
 
 Linder, Douglas (2002). The Trial of John Hinckley Jr. University of Missouri–Kansas City School of Law.
 Dean, Eddie (July 25, 1997). "Stalking Hinckley". Washington City Paper.
  "Footage of the Ronald Reagan assassination attempt".

1955 births
20th-century American criminals
American male criminals
20th-century American trials
American failed assassins
American murderers
American YouTubers
Attempted assassination of Ronald Reagan
Criminals from Oklahoma
Failed assassins of presidents of the United States
Highland Park High School (University Park, Texas) alumni
Living people
Music YouTubers
Outsider musicians
People acquitted by reason of insanity
People from Ardmore, Oklahoma
People from University Park, Texas
People from Williamsburg, Virginia
People with mood disorders
People with narcissistic personality disorder
People with schizophrenia
Stalking
Texas Tech University alumni